Asiab Sar (also Romanized as Āsīāb Sar and Ās Yāb Sar) is a village in Balatajan Rural District, in the Central District of Qaem Shahr County, Mazandaran Province, Iran. At the 2006 census, its population was 281, in 74 families.

References 

Populated places in Qaem Shahr County